Barbara Mamabolo (born November 30, 1985) is a Canadian actress and singer.

Career
Mamabolo has made guest-star appearances on the critically acclaimed series The Eleventh Hour, Sue Thomas: F.B. Eye, and Relic Hunter. Her stage credits include the role of Becky at the Tarragon Theatre's production of The Little Princess, a principal role in Ross Petty's Peter Pan at the Elgin Theatre, Dorothy in the Leah Polsun Theatre's production of The Wizard of Oz, and a member of the ensemble cast of Judy and David in Concert at the Ford Centre. She also played the role of Jude Harrison's best friend, Katarina "Kat" Benton, in first season of the hit Canadian teen drama television series, Instant Star. Mamabolo also appeared, albeit briefly, in two episodes of the Canadian drama, MVP. Mamabolo's most recent movie appearance as of 2006 was in 5ive Girls. She played the role of Robin in Confessions of a Teenage Drama Queen, alongside the antagonist (Megan Fox).

Mamabolo has since moved on to a variety of television series, including starring as the titular character of the Canadian television series Zixx. She has appeared in children's sci-fi series Mentors as Glay and co-hosts education travel series Get Outta Town. She also voices Boo-Boo in the animated television series Ruby Gloom, Scoops in Oh No! It's an Alien Invasion, Lydia Fox on Arthur, and Zoey in Total Drama.

Barbara Mamabolo was nominated for the 2003 Annual Young Artist Awards for Best Performance in a TV Drama Series - Guest Starring Young Actress for The Zack Files.

She also voices Cynder in Skylanders: Spyro's Adventure (2011).

Mamabolo has released her first record with her band Mamabolo entitled "Falling to Pieces". The band has toured with Men Without Hats and has performed at the NXNE and Montreal Jazz Festivals. Barbara Mamabolo performed one of the band's singles, "Night After Night", in the 2009 film Suck.

Filmography

Film

Television

References

External links

 
 

1985 births
Living people
20th-century Canadian actresses
21st-century Canadian actresses
Actresses from Toronto
Black Canadian actresses
21st-century Black Canadian women singers
Canadian child actresses
Canadian people of Zimbabwean descent
Canadian television actresses
Canadian voice actresses
Musicians from Toronto